This is a list of Members of Parliament (MPs) elected to the House of Commons of the United Kingdom by Welsh constituencies for the Fifty-Sixth Parliament of the United Kingdom (2015 to 2017).

It includes both MPs elected at the 2015 general election, held on 7 May 2015, and those subsequently elected in by-elections.

The list is sorted by the name of the MP, and MPs who did not serve throughout the Parliament are italicised. New MPs elected since the general election are noted at the bottom of the page.

Composition

MPs

By-elections
There has been one by-election since the 2015 general election in Ogmore following the election of Huw Irranca-Davies to the Welsh Assembly.

See also
 2015 United Kingdom general election
 List of MPs elected in the 2015 United Kingdom general election
 List of MPs for constituencies in England 2015–17
 List of MPs for constituencies in Scotland 2015–17
 List of MPs for constituencies in Northern Ireland 2015–17

References

Wales
2015-2017
MPs